The Sheung Yue River (Hong Kong Hakka: Sung1ng2 Ho2; also known as the River Beas) is a river in the northern New Territories, Hong Kong. Its sources are near Kai Kung Leng and Ki Lun Shan, where numerous streams flow into the river. It flows through Kwu Tung and Sheung Shui. It joins up with the Shek Sheung River and eventually empties into the Ng Tung River.

Beas River Country Club is located near the river. The country club was a venue for the 2008 Olympic Equestrian events.

See also
List of rivers and nullahs in Hong Kong

References
2007. 2007 Hong Kong Map. Easy Finder Ltd.

External links

Rivers of Hong Kong 

Rivers of Hong Kong
Sheung Shui